Charles Irving Thornton (January 20, 1841 – March 12, 1842) was an American infant from the state of Virginia.  His tombstone, located in Cumberland State Forest in Cumberland County, Virginia, is listed on the Virginia Landmarks Register and the National Register of Historic Places as one of only two gravestones in the world, and the only one in the United States, known to exist with an epitaph by Charles Dickens.

History
Charles Irving Thornton was the son of Anthony and M. I. Thornton of Cumberland County.  He died on March 12, 1842, at the age of 13 months and 19 days.  A Dr. Deane was attending to the child, and upon his death was moved to write to Dickens to request an epitaph to be placed on the child's grave.  Dickens had recently visited Virginia as part of his tour of the United States, but by mid-March had moved on to Ohio.  The author's reasons for complying with the doctor's request remain unclear, especially given the extreme distaste that he expressed toward Virginia's continued economic dependence on slavery; to explain his possible motivations, some historians have attempted to establish a genealogical link between Dickens, the Thorntons, and Washington Irving.

Thornton's grave may still be visited today; it is in a difficult-to-find area of the state forest, but park rangers are willing to direct people to the site.

Epitaph
The epitaph was edited slightly from the one provided by Dickens.  It reads:

References

External links 
 National Register nomination
 Description of the site

Cemeteries on the National Register of Historic Places in Virginia
1841 births
1842 deaths
Works by Charles Dickens
National Register of Historic Places in Cumberland County, Virginia
People from Cumberland County, Virginia
Burial monuments and structures
1842 works
Child deaths
American children